Jean-Lucien Kwassi Lanyo Savi de Tové (born 7 May 1939) is a Togolese politician who served in the government of Togo as Minister of Trade from 2005 to 2007.

Life and career
Savi de Tové was born in Lomé and is a member of the Ewé ethnic group. Following the January 1967 coup, he was appointed as Secretary-General of the Ministry of Foreign Affairs on 6 February 1967. Kouanvi Tigoue was later appointed to replace Savi de Tové in an interim capacity on 21 November 1974 after the latter when on leave for personal reasons, and Kodjo de Medeiros was appointed to replace Savi de Tové on a permanent basis on 26 March 1975.

Accused of plotting a coup together with various others, including Gilchrist Olympio, a warrant for his arrest was issued on 12 July 1979, and he was imprisoned. He was convicted along with four others in August 1979 and sentenced to ten years in prison.

Following the legalization of multiparty politics, Savi de Tové founded the Party of Democrats for Unity (PDU). Feeling that Prime Minister Joseph Kokou Koffigoh had grown too cooperative with President Gnassingbé Eyadéma, the Democratic Opposition Collective chose Savi de Tové as Prime Minister at a meeting in Cotonou, Benin on 22 March 1993. The official government in Lomé rejected the opposition's appointment of Savi de Tové.

The PDU merged with three other parties in 1999 to create the Patriotic Pan-African Convergence (CPP), with Edem Kodjo as its President; Savi de Tové became the CPP's First Vice-President.

Savi de Tové was appointed to the government as Minister of Trade, Industry, and Crafts on 20 June 2005. At the end of the 2006 Inter-Togolese Dialogue, he signed the resulting political accord on behalf of the CPP on 20 August 2006. He was retained as Minister of Trade, Industry, and Crafts in the government of Prime Minister Yawovi Agboyibo, appointed on 20 September 2006. In the October 2007 parliamentary election, he stood as the first candidate on the CPP's candidate list for Zio Prefecture, but the CPP won no seats in the election. Savi de Tové was dismissed from the government in December 2007.

Savi de Tové was appointed as President of the Permanent Framework for Dialogue and Consultation (CPDC), an official advisory body, on 27 May 2009.

References

1939 births
Living people
Pan-African Patriotic Convergence politicians
Togolese prisoners and detainees
Prisoners and detainees of Togo
Ewe people
21st-century Togolese people